The 1955 Jacksonville State Gamecocks football team represented Jacksonville State Teachers College (now known as Jacksonville State University) as a member of the Alabama Intercollegiate Conference (AIC) during the 1955 college football season. Led by ninth-year head coach Don Salls, the Gamecocks compiled an overall record of 10–1 with a mark of 2–1 in conference play and a victory over Rhode Island at the Refrigerator Bowl.

Schedule

References

Jacksonville State
Jacksonville State Gamecocks football seasons
Jacksonville State Gamecocks football